The Baldwin-Wallace College South Campus Historic District is an area of land on the south end of the Baldwin Wallace University campus. When the district was established, the school was Baldwin-Wallace College. BW is a four-year private, coeducation, liberal arts college in Berea, Ohio, United States. The school was founded in 1845 as Baldwin Institute by Methodists settlers. Eventually the school merged with nearby German Wallace College in 1913 to become Baldwin-Wallace College, which adopted the present name in 2012. Several buildings since its founding have been established on the National Register of Historic Places, establishing this area as the Baldwin-Wallace College South Campus Historic District.

The district

The Baldwin-Wallace College South Campus Historic District includes a four-block area that is centered on Seminary Street. The south campus of Baldwin-Wallace College incorporates the former German Wallace College campus, which was centered on the mid-19th century site of the Lyceum Village Square. Both the college and the square are listed in the National Register of Historic Places as the Lyceum Village Square and German Wallace College Historic District in 1975. The Baldwin-Wallace College South Campus Historic District includes a total of 14 buildings and one structure.

The district features a variety of collegiate, religious, and residential buildings in a campus setting, mostly constructed of Berea sandstone and brick between 1866 and 1958, and representative of architectural styles from the late 19th and early 20th century including Gothic Revival, Richardsonian Romanesque, Romanesque Revival, High Victorian Gothic and Colonial Revival.

In 2012, it was announced that Saylor, 63 Beech and Klein halls would be renovated to update their residence hall spaces.

Building List

History

Academic spaces
 19 Church Street: small commercial, two-story, flat-roofed, brick and frame building. The first business to occupy the building was a carpenter's shop that built and supplied wooden caskets. 
 Dietsch Hall: originally built as a women's dormitory for German Wallace College in 1899, Dietsch Hall is a contributing building in the Lyceum Village Square and German Wallace College Historic District (NR 1975). The building was converted to an administration building in 1935 and a classroom building in 1970.
 First Congregational Church (Conservatory Annex): Originally known as First Congregational Church of Berea. The church was dedicated in 1872. The building is the oldest still standing structure used as a church in Berea and the original Middleburg Township.
 Kulas Musical Arts Building: Construction of the Auditorium and Music Building, as it was original called, began in 1912 on a site donated by the citizens of Berea. It was dedicated June 2, 1913, two months before Baldwin University and German Wallace College were merged to establish Baldwin-Wallace College.
 Lindsay-Crossman Chapel: Built in the Romanesque Revival style in 1872, Lindsay-Crossman Chapel is a contributing building in the Lyceum Village Square and German Wallace College Historic District (NR 1975).
 Marting Hall: Constructed as the “Memorial Building” and original classroom building for German Wallace College, Marting Hall is a contributing building in the Lyceum Village Square and German Wallace College Historic District (NR 1975). Built in the Richardsonian Romanesque style.
 Merner-Pfeiffer Hall:  built in 1939-40 as a men's dormitory and is the fifth building in the Lyceum Village Square and German Wallace College Historic District, which was listed in the National Register of Historic Places in 1975.

Administrative spaces
 Baldwin-Wallace Gymnasium (Student Activities Center): The Baldwin-Wallace Gymnasium is a large two-story, rectangular, hipped-roof building with a raised basement and random ashlar Berea sandstone walls that faces Beech Street.
 Wallace House: Built c.1884 by James Wallace, the founder of German Wallace College. The former residence is now used as an office by Baldwin-Wallace College for the Honors Program.
 Wallace House Barn: Facing onto Church Street behind Wallace House and sited a few feet off the sidewalk. The garage is used for storage by the maintenance staff of Baldwin-Wallace College.

Residence halls
 63 Beech Street: This building along with Klein and Saylor Halls create a dormitory row that faces onto Beech Street.
 Klein Hall: Klein Hall and Saylor Hall are matching buildings built at the same time on either side of 63 Beech, an older dormitory built in 1929. The building continues to be used as a dormitory.
 Kohler Hall: A smaller, first used as the first Methodist Children's Home until German Wallace College bought the building (and the surrounding land) in 1866 for a residence for the vice president of the college who lived in the front rooms of the northeast wing while the rest of the building was used as a men's dormitory. Kohler Hall is a contributing building in the Lyceum Village Square and German Wallace College Historic District (NR 1975).
 Saylor Hall: Saylor Hall and Klein Hall are matching buildings built at the same time. All three building create a dormitory row that faces onto Beech Street. Saylor Hall is a three-story, rectangular, red brick dormitory.

Structures
 Stone Stairs, Piers, Cheek Walls and Retaining Wall: Originally marking the main entrance to the German Wallace College campus, The stair, piers and cheek walls constructed entirely of Berea sandstone.

References 

Berea, Ohio
Historic districts in Cuyahoga County, Ohio
Buildings at Baldwin Wallace University
German-American culture in Ohio
Historic districts on the National Register of Historic Places in Ohio
National Register of Historic Places in Cuyahoga County, Ohio

fr:Baldwin-Wallace College
no:Baldwin-Wallace College
ru:Колледж Болдуина-Уоллеса